Saint-Vincent-de-Paul is a district in the eastern part of Laval, Quebec, Canada. Saint-Vincent-de-Paul was a town before August 6, 1965. Saint-Vincent-de-Paul is named after Vincent de Paul.

Geography 
It is surrounded by Duvernay at the west and by Saint-François at the north and east.

Roads and Bridges 
The Pie IX Bridge connects St-Vincent-de-Paul and the Montreal borough of Montreal North across the Rivière des Prairies.

Education
Commission scolaire de Laval operates Francophone public schools.
 Saint-Vincent-de-Paul has one public high school, École secondaire Georges-Vanier.
 École primaire Du Bois-Joli
 École primaire Jean XXIII
 École primaire L’Envol (alternative school)

It has one Francophone private school: Collège Laval

Sir Wilfrid Laurier School Board operates Anglophone public schools. Elementary schools serving Saint-Vincent-de-Paul include:
 Saint Vincent Elementary School
All portions of Laval are zoned to Laval Junior Academy and Laval Senior Academy.

References

External links 
 

Neighbourhoods in Laval, Quebec
Populated places disestablished in 1965